Rob Boras (born September 30, 1970) is an American football coach who is the tight ends coach for the Buffalo Bills of the National Football League (NFL).  He served as offensive coordinator of the St.Louis/Los Angeles Rams from 2015–2016 and as head coach at Benedictine University in 1998, compiling an overall record of three wins and seven losses.  During his career, he has also been an assistant coach at DePauw, Texas, UNLV, as well as for the NFL's Chicago Bears and Jacksonville Jaguars.

Coaching career
Boras started his coaching career at his alma mater, DePauw University, as the offensive line coach. He then moved on to the University of Texas where he served in various coaching positions over four years with the Texas Longhorns football team. After further stints at Benedictine University and UNLV, Boras became the tight ends coach for the Chicago Bears in February 2004. Boras was relieved of his duties with the Chicago Bears in January 2010 along with five other offensive coaches.

In February 2010, Boras was hired by the Jacksonville Jaguars to succeed newly hired Chicago Bears' offensive line coach Mike Tice as tight ends coach.

On December 7, 2015, Boras was promoted to offensive coordinator for the St. Louis Rams following the firing of Frank Cignetti Jr. On February 25, 2016, Rob Boras was named permanent offensive coordinator for the Los Angeles Rams.

On January 17, 2017, Boras was hired by the Buffalo Bills as the team's tight end coach.

Head coaching record

References

1970 births
Living people
American football centers
Benedictine Eagles football coaches
Buffalo Bills coaches
Chicago Bears coaches
DePauw Tigers football coaches
DePauw Tigers football players
Jacksonville Jaguars coaches
Los Angeles Rams coaches
St. Louis Rams coaches
Texas Longhorns football coaches
UNLV Rebels football coaches
People from Glen Ellyn, Illinois